Molecular Systems Biology is a peer-reviewed open-access scientific journal covering systems biology at the molecular level (examples include: genomics, proteomics, metabolomics, microbial systems, the integration of cell signaling and regulatory networks), synthetic biology, and systems medicine. It was established in 2005 and published by the Nature Publishing Group on behalf of the European Molecular Biology Organization. As of December 2013, it is published by EMBO Press.

References

External links

Molecular and cellular biology journals
Systems biology
Publications established in 2005
English-language journals
Monthly journals
European Molecular Biology Organization academic journals